Aharon אַהֲרֹן is masculine given name original spelling, commonly in Israel, of the later version Aaron, prominent biblical figure in the Old Testament, "Of the Mountains", or "Mountaineer". There are other variants including "Ahron" and "Aron".  Aharon is also occasionally a patronymic surname, usually with the hyphenated prefix "Ben-". People with the name include:

Given name
 Aharon Abuhatzira (1938–2021), Israeli politician
 Aharon Amar (born 1937), Israeli footballer
 Aharon Amir (1923–2008), Israeli poet, translator, and writer
 Aharon Amram (born 1939), Israeli singer, composer, poet, and researcher
 Aharon Appelfeld (1932–2018), Israeli novelist and Holocaust survivor
 Aharon April (1932–2020), Russian artist
 Aharon Barak (born 1936), Israeli lawyer and jurist
 Aharon Becker (1905–1995), Israeli politician
 Aharon Ben-Shemesh (1889–1988), Israeli writer, translator, and lecturer
 Aharon Chelouche (1840–1920), Algerian landowner, jeweler, and moneychanger
 Aharon Cohen (1910–1980), Israeli politician
 Aharon Danziger, Israeli Paralympic volleyball player
 Aharon Davidi (1927–2012), Israeli general
 Aharon Dolgopolsky (1930–2012), Russian-Israeli linguist
 Aharon Doron (1922–2016), Israeli general and educator
 Aharon Efrat (1911–1989), Israeli politician
 Aharon Feldman (born 1932), American rabbi
 Aharon Galstyan (born 1970), Armenian-Russian serial killer
 Aharon Gershgoren (born 1948), Israeli footballer
 Aharon Gluska (born 1951), Israeli-American painter
 Aharon Goldstein (1902–1976), Israeli politician
 Aharon Gurevich, Russian rabbi
 Aharon HaLevi (1235– c. 1290), Spanish rabbi, scholar, and Halakhist
 Aharon Haliva (born 1967), Israeli Major general
 Aharon Harel (1932–2000), Israeli politician
 Aharon Hoter-Yishai, Israeli Military Advocate General
 Aharon Ibn Hayyim (1545–1632), Moroccan scholar
 Aharon Ipalé (1941–2016), Israeli-American actor
 Aharon Isser (1958–1995), Israeli aeronautical engineer
 Aharon Jacobashvili (born 1964), Israeli boxer
 Aharon of Karlin (I) (1736–1772), Polish-Lithuanian rabbi
 Aharon of Karlin (II) (1802–1872), Russian rabbi
 Aharon Kapitulnik (born 1953), Israeli-American physicist
 Aharon Katzir (1914–1972), Israeli chemist
 Aharon Keshales (born 1976), Israeli film director, screenwriter, and film critic
 Aharon Moshe Kiselev (1866–1949), Russian-Manchurian rabbi
 Yitzhak Aharon Korff, American rabbi
 Aharon Kotler (1892–1962), Lithuanian-American rabbi
 Aharon Lichtenstein (1933–2015), French rabbi
 Aharon Megged (1920–2016), Israeli author and playwright
 Aharon Meskin (1898–1974), Israeli stage actor
 Aharon Mor (born 1947), Polish-Israeli civil servant
 Aharon Mordechai Rokeach (born 1975), Israeli rabbi
 Aharon Nahmias (1932–1998), Israeli politician
 Aharon Perlow of Koidanov (1839–1897) – third Rebbe of Koidanov
 Aharon Pfeuffer (1949–1993), Israeli rabbi
 Avraham Aharon Price (1900–1994), Canadian scholar, writer, educator, and community leader
 Aharon Razel (born 1974), Israeli musician
 Aharon Razin (1935–2019), Israeli biochemist
 Aharon Remez (1919–1994), Israeli civil servant, politician, diplomat, and Air Force commander
 Aharon Rokeach (1880–1957), Ukrainian rabbi
 Aharon Roth (1894–1947), Hungarian rabbi and scholar
 Aharon Shabtai (born 1939), Israeli poet and translator
 Aharon Leib Shteinman (1914–2017), Israeli rabbi
 Aharon Shulov (1907–1997), Israeli entomologist
 Aharon Solomons (born 1939), Anglo-Israeli Army officer and freediver
 Aharon Sorasky (born 1940), Israeli author
 Aharon Uzan (1924–2007), Israeli politician
 Aharon Wasserman (born 1986), American entrepreneur and software designer
 Aharon Yadlin (1926–2022), Israeli educator and politician
 Aharon Yariv (1920–1994), Israeli politician and general
 Aharon Ze'evi-Farkash (born 1948), Israeli general
 Aharon Zisling (1901–1964), Israeli politician and minister
 Aharon Zorea (born 1969), American historian
 Aharon of Zhitomir, Ukrainian rabbi

Surname
 Dudu Aharon (born 1984), Israeli singer-songwriter, musician, and composer
 Michal Aharon, Israeli computer scientist
 Shay Aharon (born 1978), Israeli retired footballer
 Yossi Aharon, Israeli bouzouki player

See also
 Ben-Aharon (surname)
 Beis Aharon Synagogue of Karlin-Stolin, Jerusalem
 Ahron
 Aron (name)
 Aaron (given name)
 Aaron (surname)

References

Masculine given names
Jewish given names